This is a list of schools in Oakville, Ontario, Canada.

Halton District School Board
These schools are part of the Halton District School Board, the public English education board for the region.

Public elementary schools
 Abbey Lane Public School (JK-G8)
 Brookdale Public School (JK-G8)
 Captain R. Wilson Public School (JK-G8) 
Eastview Public School (JK-G8)
 Emily Carr Public School (JK-G8)
 E.J. James Public School (G2-G8)
 Falgarwood Public School (JK-G8)
 Forest Trail Public School (G2-G8)
 Gladys Speers Public School (JK-G6)
 Heritage Glen Public School (JK-G8)
 James W Hill Public School (JK-G8)
 Joshua Creek Public School(JK-G8)
 Maple Grove Public School (JK-G8)
 Montclair Public School (JK-G8)
 Munn's Public School (G1-G8)
 New Central Public School (JK-G6)
 Oakwood Public School (JK-G5)
 Oodenawi Public School (JK-G8)
 Palermo Public School (JK-G8)
 Pilgrim Wood Public School (JK-G8)
 École Pine Grove Public School (G2-G8)
 Post's Corners Public School (JK-G8)
 River Oaks Public School (JK-G8)
 Sheridan Public School (JK-G5)
 Sunningdale Public School (G1-G8)
 West Oak Public School (JK-G8)
 W.H. Morden Public School (JK-G8)

Public high schools
 Abbey Park High School
 Iroquois Ridge High School
 Oakville Trafalgar High School
 T. A. Blakelock High School
 White Oaks Secondary School
 Garth Webb Secondary School

Halton Catholic District School Board
These schools are part of the Halton Catholic District School Board, the separate English education board for the region.

Catholic elementary schools

 Holy Family Catholic Elementary School
 St. Teresa of Calcutta Catholic Elementary School
 Our Lady of Peace Catholic Elementary School 
 St. Andrew Catholic Elementary School
 St. Bernadette Catholic Elementary School (French Extended) 
 St. Dominic Catholic Elementary School
 St. Gregory the Great Catholic Elementary School
 St. Joan of Arc Catholic Elementary School
 St. John Paul II Catholic Elementary School
 St. Luke Catholic Elementary School
 St. Marguerite d'Youville Catholic Elementary School (French Immersion)
 St. Mary Catholic Elementary School (French Immersion) 
 St. Matthew Catholic Elementary School (French Extended) 
 St. Michael Catholic Elementary School 
 St. Nicholas Catholic Elementary School (French Extended)
 St. Vincent Catholic Elementary School

Catholic high schools
 Holy Trinity Catholic Secondary School
 St. Ignatius of Loyola Catholic Secondary School
 St. Thomas Aquinas Catholic Secondary School

Conseil scolaire Viamonde
This school is part of the Conseil scolaire Viamonde, the public French education board for the region.

 École Patricia-Picknell (JK-G6)
 École élémentaire du Chêne (JK-G6)
 École secondaire Gaetan Gervais (9-12)

Conseil scolaire de district catholique Centre-Sud
This school is part of the Conseil scolaire de district catholique Centre-Sud, the separate French education board for the region.

 École Saint Marie
 École Secondaire Catholique Sainte-Trinité

Private schools
 Al Falah Islamic School (JK-8)
 Appleby College (7-12)
 Chisholm Academy (6-12)
 Clanmore Montessori School (PK-6)
 Dearcroft Montessori School (PS-8)
 Fern Hill School (PS-8)
 Glenburnie School (PK-8)
 John Knox Christian School (JK-8)
 Kavalan Montessori Daycare (PS)
 Kinderhuis Montessori Preschool (PS)
 King's Christian Collegiate (9-12)
 Linbrook School (boys only, JK-8)
 MacLachlan College (PK-12)
 Marian Montessori School (PK-1)
 Oakville Christian School (PK-8)
 Rotherglen School & Rotherglen Montessori (PK-8)
 St. Mildred's-Lightbourn School (girls only, PS-12)
 Trafalgar Ridge Montessori School (PK-3)
 Westwind Montessori (4-8)
 Wildwood Academy 
 Willowglen School (PS-6)

Oakville